Sjur Loen (born 19 May 1958, in Oppdal) is a Norwegian curler and world champion. He participated on the winning team in the demonstration event at the 1988 Winter Olympics.

International championships
Loen is two times world champion, and has received four bronze medals at the world championships.

Loen has obtained one victory at the European Curling Championships, two silver medals and three bronze medals.

References

External links

 Video: 

1958 births
Living people
People from Oppdal
Norwegian male curlers
Olympic curlers of Norway
Curlers at the 1988 Winter Olympics
World curling champions
European curling champions
Norwegian curling champions
Sportspeople from Trøndelag
20th-century Norwegian people